The Cléon-Alu engine, also known under the code "A engine" or "A-Type" (A for aluminium) is an automotive gasoline internal combustion engine, developed and produced by Renault in 1960. A four-stroke inline four-cylinder design with aluminium-alloy block and cylinder head, it was water cooled, with a five main bearing crankshaft and a side-mounted chain-driven camshaft operating eight overhead valves via pushrods and rockers. It made its debut appearance on the Renault 16.

AxK

Applications:
 A1K 
 Renault 16
 1967–1970 Lotus Europa S1 and S2 (types 46 and 54)

AxL

Applications:
 A2L 
 1968–1980 Renault 16
 1971–1976 Renault 15 TS
 1972–1976 Renault 17 TL
 1970–1973 Renault 12 Gordini
 1972–1974 Renault 12 Gordini 
 1973–1975 Alpine A110 1600 S 
 1971–1974 Alpine A310 1600 VE 
 1969–1970 Lotus Europa S2 Federal (type 65)
 A5L  Turbo
 –1984 Renault 18 Turbo
 1983–1985 Renault Fuego Turbo
 A7L 
 1985– Renault R18
 A7L 
 –1984 Renault 18 Turbo

AxM
It was originally known as the type 841 or 843, depending on output. Often used as a designator for the Renault R17 Gordini sub-model in the USA market 843/13. , Compression Ratio 9.25:1 with Bosch L-Jetronic Fuel Injection and standard distributor with points/condenser for timing.

 A1M
 1981–1986 Renault Trafic
 A2M / 841
 –1984 Renault 18
 1985–1986 Renault 18
 1982–1985 Renault Fuego GTL
 A6M / 843
 1975–1976 Alpine A310
 –1984 Renault 18
 1975–1980 Renault 16 TL
 1975–1981 Renault 20 L/TL/GTL
 1985–1986 Renault 18
 1980–1985 Renault Fuego TS/GTS

References

Cléon-Alu
Gasoline engines by model
Straight-four engines